The enzyme acetylajmaline esterase (EC 3.1.1.80, AAE, 2β(R)-17-O-acetylajmalan:acetylesterase, acetylajmalan esterase; systematic name 17-O-acetylajmaline O-acetylhydrolase) catalyses the following reactions:

 (1) 17-O-acetylajmaline + H2O  ajmaline + acetate
 (2) 17-O-acetylnorajmaline + H2O  norajmaline + acetate

This plant enzyme mediates the last stages in the biosynthesis of the indole alkaloid ajmaline.

References

External links 
 

EC 3.1.1